Beak 3 (stylized as >>> or Beak>>>) is the third studio album by British band Beak. It was released on 21 September 2018 under Temporary Residence Limited.

Release
On 11 July 2018, the band announced the release of the album, along with the first single "Brean Down".

Critical reception
Beak 3 was met with "generally favorable" reviews from critics. At Album of the Year, the album was given a 78 out of 100 based on a critical consensus of 11 reviews.

Accolades

Track listing

Personnel

Musicians
 Geoff Barrow – lead vocalist
 Billy Fuller – guitar
 Matt Williams – drums
 Will Young – backing vocals
 Harriet Wiltshire – cello
 Alison Gillies – cello
 Juliet McCarthy – cello

Production
 Shawn Joseph – mastering
 Stu Matthews – engineer
 James Trevascus – engineer

Charts

References

2018 albums
Temporary Residence Limited albums